Basketball shoes are footwear designed specifically for playing basketball.  Special shoe designs for basketball have existed since the 1920s. This list includes major brands of basketball shoe, listed by manufacturer and year of introduction.

 Adidas
 Jabbar- worn by Kareem Abdul-Jabbar (1971)
 Top 10 (1979)
 Ewing Rivalry 3- worn by Patrick Ewing (1986)
 Real Deal II- Worn by Antoine Walker (1986)
 Ewing Attitude- worn by Patrick Ewing (1987)
 Ewing Conductor- worn by Patrick Ewing (1987)
 Mutombo- worn by Dikembe Mutombo (1992)
 EQT Elevation- worn by Kobe Bryant (1996)
 EQT Top Ten- worn by Kobe Bryant (1996)
 K8B (Kobe Bryant signature shoe) (1997)
 Real Deal- worn by Antonie Walker (1997)
 KB82- worn by Kobe Bryant (1998)
 Bromium- worn by Chris Webber (1999)
 KB8 III- worn by Kobe Bryant (1999)
 TMAC- worn by Tracy McGrady (2002)
 TMAC 2- worn by Tracy McGrady (2003)
 TMAC III- worn by Tracy McGrady (2004)
 C-Billups- worn by Chauncey Billups (2006)
 Kevin Garnett III- worn by Kevin Garnett (2006)
 TMAC VI- worn by Tracy McGrady (2006)
 Skyhoot Plus Low- worn by Kareem Abdul-Jabbar (2007)
 adiZero Rose- worn by Derrick Rose (2009)
 TS Commander LIte "Skeleton" - worn by Tim Duncan (2009)
 adiZero Rose 1.5- worn by Derrick Rose (2010)
 Superbeast- worn by Dwight Howard (2010)
 Dame line – worn by Damian Lillard (2014–present)
 Harden line – worn by James Harden (2016–present)
 D.O.N. line – worn by Donovan Mitchell (2018–present)

 AND1

 Athletic Propulsion Labs (APL)
 Load 'N Launch (2009)

 Anta
 GH- worn by Gordon Hayward (present)
 KT- worn by Klay Thompson (present)

 Converse

 Chuck Taylor All-Stars (1918)

 Ektio
 Wraptor (2010)
 Post Up (2010)

 Gaze

 Li-Ning
 Way of Wade – worn by Dwyane Wade from 2012 until his 2018 retirement, and remains in production today

 New Balance
 KAWHI line (2020–present)

 Nike
 
 Blazers (1973)
 Air Jordan (1985)
 Air Max (1987)
 Hyper series (2008)
 LeBron signature line (2003–present)
 Kobe signature line (2005)
 KD signature line (2005–present)
 Kyrie signature line (2014–2022)
 PG Signature line (2017–present)
 Zoom Freak (Giannis Antetokounmpo signature line) (2019–present)
 Ja Morant signature line (2022–present)

 Reebok
 Pump (1989)

 Under Armour

 Micro G (2010)
 Black Ice
 Fly
 Blur
 Lite.
 Curry line (2015–2020)
 Curry Brand (2020–present)
 Embiid line (2020–present)

 Xtep
 JLIN ONE (2020)

References

Athletic shoe brands
Lists of brands
Clothing-related lists